Montgomery School District may refer to:
 Montgomery School District (Sonoma County, California), a district in Sonoma County, California
 Montgomery Area School District, Pennsylvania
 Montgomery Independent School District, Texas
 Montgomery County School District, which merged into the Winona-Montgomery Consolidated School District, Mississippi